Canopus (or Alpha Carinae) is the brightest star in the southern constellation of Carina.

Canopus may also refer to:
 Canopus (insect), Neotropical bug genus
 Canopus (mythology), in Homeric myth, the pilot of King Menelaus's ship
 Canopus (nuclear test) was the name given to the first test of the French hydrogen bomb, in 1968, with a yield of 2.8 megatons
 Canopus (Thrace), a town of ancient Thrace, a suburb of Byzantium
 Canopus, Egypt, an ancient Egyptian city near modern-day Abu Qir, in the Nile Delta
 Canopus 2, an Argentine sounding rocket
 Canopus Corporation, a manufacturer of video editing cards and video editing software
 Canopus G-ADHL, a Short Empire flying boat
 Canopus in Argos, a series of space fiction by Doris Lessing
 Canopic jar, ancient Egyptian vessel for storing organs removed by mummification procedure
 Canopus Lake, a lake in Clarence Fahnestock State Park in New York State, USA

 HMS Canopus, two ships of the Royal Navy
 USS Canopus, three ships of the United States Navy